The 2017 Podemos state assembly—officially the 2nd Citizen Assembly, and more informally referred to as Vistalegre II—was held between 7 December 2016 and 12 February 2017. Party members would be able to vote on the party's strategic proposals as well as the new leadership composition from February 4 to February 11. While Pablo Iglesias's re-election bid as Secretary General was not disputed, there was strong media interest in the assembly because of a strong internal debate between Iglesias and his Political Secretary, Íñigo Errejón, on the party's strategy and main lines of action for the ensuing years.

Background

Timetable

Results

Secretary General

State Citizen Council

Documents

References

Podemos (Spanish political party)
2017 conferences
Political party assemblies in Spain
Political party leadership elections in Spain